"We Can't Be Friends" is a song by Canadian singer Deborah Cox, featuring American singer R.L. of R&B group Next. It was written by Shep Crawford and Jimmy Russell for her second studio album One Wish (1998), while production was overseen by Crawford. Selected as the album's third single, the duet was airplayed on December 21, 1998 but released on September 14, 1999, and became her second single to reach number one on the Billboard Hot R&B/Hip-Hop Songs, while peaking at number eight on the Billboard Hot 100.

Charts

Certifications

See also
 List of Hot R&B Singles & Tracks number ones of 1999

References 

1998 songs
1999 singles
Deborah Cox songs
Songs written by Shep Crawford
Arista Records singles
Songs about heartache
Contemporary R&B ballads
1990s ballads